Carlo Prajer or Carlo Prayer (Active 1789-1832) was a late 18th- and early 19th-century painter and engraver. He was born in Milan, and active in Lombardy. A pupil of Andrea Appiani, he became director of the Accademia Carrara in Bergamo. He painted four canvases designed by Giuseppe Bossi depicting the Life of Leonardo for the Villa Melzi d'Eril in Bellagio.

References

18th-century Italian painters
Italian male painters
19th-century Italian painters
Italian engravers
Painters from Bergamo
Painters from Milan
1789 births
1832 deaths
19th-century Italian male artists
18th-century Italian male artists